Ave Maria is a 1936 German musical drama film. It stars Italian opera tenor Beniamino Gigli and German actress Käthe von Nagy.

Plot 
Tino Dossi (Beniamino Gigli), a wealthy, famous, and older opera singer, is grieving over the terrible loss of his wife, a devoted French woman. Each year, he travels to Paris to visit her grave, but one year he is forced to go a concert his manager has arranged. While enjoying the concert, his manager visits a seedy night club and, while drunk, tells a cabaret entertainer, and her lover, that the singer is very unhappy and also wealthy.

The scheming night club girl called, Chansonnière Claudette (Käthe von Nagy), meets and accompanies the singer to Naples, pretending to be upset about his wife's demise. The singer and the girl are later engaged, but he discovers her lies and she, now genuinely in love with him, drives away in a car, but is badly injured in a resulting serious car crash. The singer, now aware of her repentance and true affectation for him, takes her for his bride.

See also 
 You Walk So Softly
 Her Majesty the Barmaid
 I by Day, You by Night

References

External links

1936 films
1930s musical drama films
German musical drama films
Films of Nazi Germany
1930s German-language films
German black-and-white films
Films set in Paris
Films set in Naples
1936 drama films
1930s German films